Metal Down Under is a 2014 documentary directed by Nick Calpakdjian. The film uses interviews, archival footage and animation to trace the history of heavy metal music in Australia. Calpakdjian partly funded the film through crowd-funding website Pozible. It was released in Australia on 22 August 2014 with distribution by MGM. On 1 September 2014 it debuted on the ARIA Top 40 Music DVDs chart at #4.

Content
Metal Down Under traces the history of heavy metal music in Australia from the early influences of bands such as Buffalo, AC/DC, The Angels and Rose Tattoo to present day acts including Ne Obliviscaris, King Parrot, Karnivool and Psycroptic. The film is divided into three 55-minute episodes featuring interviews, archival footage and animation sequences with the first episode discussing the early development of metal from hard rock influences to the thrash scenes of late 1980s Melbourne and Sydney, in particular Hobbs' Angel of Death and Mortal Sin. There is also some examination of the niche record stores Metal For Melbourne and Utopia, Hot Metal magazine and the influence of public radio on the spread of the genre. Part two looks at the influence of Perth band Allegiance in the development of a national touring circuit, as well as the Metal for the Brain festival and the extreme metal bands Blood Duster, Alchemist and Sadistik Exekution. The third part looks primarily at several of the more prominent currently active bands with some discussion of the metalcore scene and the shape of the scene at the present time.

Distribution
Metal Down Under was released on DVD in Australia through MGM Distribution. It was released in the UK and Europe through Plastichead Distribution on 10 November 2014. Its official release date on iTunes is 18 November 2014 worldwide (ex USA).

Reviews

"Nick Calpakdjian has made a funny and engrossing film that finally sheds a light on a part of Australia's popular culture that has been left in the dark for its entire existence, a vital and important document that even people who couldn't care less about heavy metal should see. After spending two years of his life on this, he deserves nothing but respect." Reviewed by Brian Giffin.

"One might even go so far as to say that Metal Down Under is an important piece for the Metal community, as it may well be, itself, a stepping stone to another such feature in the future; and that will hold promise for another time. " Reviewed by Tristan Peterson, Metal Obsession.

Interviews

Non-musicians
 Andrew Haug, broadcaster
 Lochlan Watt, broadcaster, writer
 Brad Wesson, co-owner, Soundworks Touring
 Robyn Doreian, journalist, editor Hot Metal magazine
 Greta Tate, record store manager
 Simon Lukic, broadcaster
 Chris Maric, publicist
 Leigh Wilson, collector who has filmed Australian metal shows since 1981
 Brian Giffin, writer, broadcaster

References

External links
IMDb page

2014 films
Australian documentary films
Documentary films about heavy metal music and musicians
2014 documentary films
2010s English-language films